Sharon Greene Larsen (born February 6, 1939) served as the second counselor to Margaret D. Nadauld in the General Presidency of the Young Women of the Church of Jesus Christ of Latter-day Saints (LDS Church) from 1997 to 2002.

Larsen was born and raised in Glenwood, Alberta, Canada.  Larsen studied at the University of Alberta and then at Brigham Young University (BYU) where she earned a degree in elementary education.  She taught school in St. Louis, Missouri and in Davis County, Utah.

In the LDS Church, Larsen served in a variety of callings in the Young Women and Relief Society as well as a seminary and institute teacher.

Larsen is married to Ralph T. Larsen and they are the parents of two children.  Ralph is a dentist.

References
"Sharon G. Larson: Second Counselor, Young Women General Presidency", Ensign, November 2011

1939 births
Brigham Young University alumni
Canadian leaders of the Church of Jesus Christ of Latter-day Saints
Church Educational System instructors
Counselors in the General Presidency of the Young Women (organization)
Living people
People from Cardston County
University of Alberta alumni